Mycetocola is a Gram-positive non-spore-forming and non-motile genus from the family of Microbacteriaceae.

References 

Microbacteriaceae
Bacteria genera
Taxa described in 2001